In mathematics, the Sato–Tate conjecture is a statistical statement about the family of elliptic curves Ep obtained from an elliptic curve E over the rational numbers by reduction modulo almost all prime numbers p. Mikio Sato and John Tate independently posed the conjecture around 1960.

If Np denotes the number of points on the elliptic curve Ep defined over the finite field with p elements, the conjecture gives an answer to the distribution of the second-order term for Np. By Hasse's theorem on elliptic curves,

The original conjecture and its generalization to all totally real fields was proved by Laurent Clozel, Michael Harris, Nicholas Shepherd-Barron, and Richard Taylor under mild assumptions in 2008, and completed by Thomas Barnet-Lamb, David Geraghty, Harris, and Taylor in 2011. Several generalizations to other algebraic varieties and fields are open.

Statement
Let E be an elliptic curve defined over the rational numbers without complex multiplication.  For a prime number p, define θp as the solution to the equation

Details
By Hasse's theorem on elliptic curves, the ratio

is between -1 and 1. Thus it can be expressed as cos θ for an angle θ; in geometric terms there are two eigenvalues accounting for the remainder and with the denominator as given they are complex conjugate and of absolute value 1. The Sato–Tate conjecture, when E doesn't have complex multiplication, states that the probability measure of θ is proportional to

This is due to Mikio Sato and John Tate (independently, and around 1960, published somewhat later).

Proof
In 2008, Clozel, Harris, Shepherd-Barron, and Taylor published a proof of the Sato–Tate conjecture for elliptic curves over totally real fields satisfying a certain condition: of having multiplicative reduction at some prime, in a series of three joint papers.

Further results are conditional on improved forms of the Arthur–Selberg trace formula. Harris has a conditional proof of a result for the product of two elliptic curves (not isogenous) following from such a hypothetical trace formula. In 2011, Barnet-Lamb, Geraghty, Harris, and Taylor proved a generalized version of the Sato–Tate conjecture for an arbitrary non-CM holomorphic modular form of weight greater than or equal to two, by improving the potential modularity results of previous papers. The prior issues involved with the trace formula were solved by Michael Harris, and Sug Woo Shin.

In 2015, Richard Taylor was awarded the Breakthrough Prize in Mathematics "for numerous breakthrough results in (...) the Sato–Tate conjecture."

Generalisations
There are generalisations, involving the distribution of Frobenius elements in Galois groups involved in the Galois representations on étale cohomology. In particular there is a conjectural theory for curves of genus n > 1.

Under the random matrix model developed by Nick Katz and Peter Sarnak, there is a conjectural correspondence between (unitarized) characteristic polynomials of Frobenius elements and conjugacy classes in the compact Lie group USp(2n) = Sp(n).  The Haar measure on USp(2n) then gives the conjectured distribution, and the classical case is USp(2) = SU(2).

Refinements
There are also more refined statements. The Lang–Trotter conjecture (1976) of Serge Lang and Hale Trotter states the asymptotic number of primes p with a given value of ap, the trace of Frobenius that appears in the formula. For the typical case (no complex multiplication, trace ≠ 0) their formula states that the number of p up to X is asymptotically

with a specified constant c. Neal Koblitz (1988) provided detailed conjectures for the case of a prime number q of points on Ep, motivated by elliptic curve cryptography.
In 1999, Chantal David and Francesco Pappalardi proved an averaged version of the Lang–Trotter conjecture.

References

External links
Report on Barry Mazur giving context
Michael Harris notes, with statement (PDF)
La Conjecture de Sato–Tate [d'après Clozel, Harris, Shepherd-Barron, Taylor], Bourbaki seminar June 2007 by Henri Carayol (PDF)
 Video introducing Elliptic curves and its relation to Sato-Tate conjecture, Imperial College London, 2014  (Last 15 minutes)

Elliptic curves
Finite fields
Conjectures
Unsolved problems in geometry